The 2007 Armenian Cup was the 16th edition of the Armenian Cup, a football competition. In 2007, the tournament had 14 participants, out of which 4 were reserve teams.

Results

First round

Pyunik and Mika received byes to the quarter finals, as they were champions and cup holders respectively.

The first legs were played on 21 and 22 March 2007. The second legs were played on 31 March and 1 April 2007.

|}

Quarter-finals
The first legs were played on 5 and 6 April 2007. The second legs were played on 10 April 2007.

|}

Semi-finals
The first legs were played on 18 April 2007. The second legs were played on 1 May 2007.

|}

Final

See also
 2007 Armenian Premier League
 2007 Armenian First League

External links
 Official site
 2007 Armenian Cup at Soccerway.com
 2007 Armenian Cup at rsssf.com

Armenian Cup seasons
Armenia
Armenian Cup, 2007